Cicagna is a comune (municipality) in the Metropolitan City of Genoa in the Italian region Liguria, located about  east of Genoa.

Cicagna borders the following municipalities: Coreglia Ligure, Lorsica, Mocònesi, Orero, Rapallo, Tribogna.

References

Cities and towns in Liguria